Glitterbug may refer to:

Glitterbug (film), final film of Derek Jarman
Glitterbug (album), album by The Wombats, 2015
Glitterbug Tour 2015, by The Wombats
Glitterbug B Sides EP by The Wombats exclusive to HMV 2015
"Glitterbug", song by Page and Duffy from album The Vanity Project
"Glitterbug", song from Slinky Vagabond Keanan Duffty
Glitterbug (band) from Insomnia Festival and Nabovarsel